Cardabia Station, commonly referred to as Carbabia, is a pastoral lease that operates as a cattle station in the Gascoyne region of Western Australia.

Warroora Station is on Carbadia's southern boundary.

Cardabia is currently owned by the Indigenous Land Corporation, who acquired the  property in 1997. The Indigenous Land Corporation divested to the Baiyangu Aboriginal Corporation in 1998; the latter operate the property, including providing training opportunities to the traditional owners of the area.

By 1913 approximately 16,000 sheep were shorn, producing 330 bales of wool.

The area was struck by drought, with only  of rain falling through a 13-month period from mid-1918 to late 1919.

In 2015 the station owners had to renegotiate the lease agreement with the state government, including having the government excise sections of pastoral land along the world-heritage listed Ningaloo Coast from the property, for conservation and tourism ventures.

See also
 List of pastoral leases in Western Australia

References

Stations (Australian agriculture)
Pastoral leases in Western Australia
Shire of Carnarvon